Facciolella gilbertii, known commonly as the Dogface witch-eel, is an eel in the family Nettastomatidae (duckbill/witch eels). It was described by Samuel Garman in 1899. It is a marine, deep water-dwelling eel which is known from the eastern central Pacific Ocean, including California, USA, and Panama. It is known to dwell at a depth of 935 metres. It is often caught in bottom trawls. Females are oviparous, and the larvae are planktonic. Males can reach a maximum total length of 61 centimetres.

The species epithet "gilbertii" was given in honour of American ichthyologist Charles H. Gilbert. F. gilbertii's diet consists of deep-sea crustaceans and zooplankton.

References

Nettastomatidae
Fish described in 1899